Carme Blay (born 31 July 1973 in Sant Pere de Ribes) is a retired Spanish athlete who specialised in the sprinting events. She represented her country in the 4 × 100 metres relay at the 1999 and 2003 World Championships and in the 60 metres at the 1995 and 2004 World Indoor Championships. She is a seven-times national champion in the 100 metres (1995, 1997, 2000-2003) and a ten-time champion in the indoor 60 metres (1995-2004). She retired after the 2005 season.

Competition record

Personal bests
Outdoor
100 metres – 11.57 (+1.1 m/s) (Salamanca 1996)
200 metres – 24.45 (-0.9 m/s) (Castellón 2002)
Indoor
60 metres – 7.35 (Valencia 1998)

References

1971 births
Living people
Spanish female sprinters
Sportswomen from Catalonia
Athletes from Barcelona
World Athletics Championships athletes for Spain
Mediterranean Games silver medalists for Spain
Mediterranean Games medalists in athletics
Athletes (track and field) at the 1997 Mediterranean Games
Athletes (track and field) at the 2005 Mediterranean Games